The Marulta were an indigenous Australian people of the state of Queensland, Australia.

Language
The Marulta spoke Marrulha, one of several dialects of a Karnic language, similar to Mithaka.

Country
The Marulta were a people of Lake Barrolka, with, according to Norman Tindale, an estimated  of territory, extending south as far as Lake Yamma Yamma, and west to the Beal Range. Their northeasterly reach ran to the vicinity of Opalville and Cooper Creek.

Alternative name
 Marula
 Marunga
 Marrulha

Notes

Citations

Sources

Aboriginal peoples of Queensland